The Saint-Michel tumulus is a megalithic grave mound, located east of Carnac in Brittany, France. It is the largest grave mound in continental Europe.

History 

The tumulus was built during the fifth millennium BC. Explored in 1862, researchers found there a central vault containing fairly prestigious funerary furniture: axes, pearls, flint tools and sillimanite.

It has been classified as a "Monument historique" (National heritage site) since 1889.

Around 1900, the archaeologist  again excavated the Saint-Michel tumulus and discovered a second dolmen and fifteen small stone chests, thus revealing the complexity of this monument.

Gallery

References

Archaeological sites in Brittany
Megalithic monuments in Brittany
Buildings and structures in Morbihan
Geography of Brittany
Tourist attractions in Morbihan
Monuments historiques of Morbihan
Tumuli in France
Buildings and structures completed in the 5th millennium BC